Bligh may refer to:

Surname
 Anna Bligh (born 1960), Australian politician 
 George Miller Bligh (1780–1834), British naval officer, son of Richard Rodney Bligh
 Jasmine Bligh (1913–1991), British television presenter
 Richard Bligh (1780–1838), British barrister
 Richard Rodney Bligh (1737–1821), British naval officer
 Thomas Bligh (1685–1775), British army general
 Thomas Bligh (1654–1710), (1654–1710) Irish politician
 William Bligh (1754–1817), British naval officer whose command of the HMS Bounty was challenged by 1789 mutiny

Members of the family of the Earl of Darnley, an English aristocratic family associated with cricket in Kent:
 John Bligh, 1st Earl of Darnley (1687–1728), son of Thomas Bligh (1654–1710)
 Edward Bligh, 2nd Earl of Darnley (1715–1747), peer
 John Bligh, 3rd Earl of Darnley (1719–1781), parliamentarian
 John Bligh, 4th Earl of Darnley (1767–1831), peer and cricketer
 General Edward Bligh (1769–1840), soldier, politician and cricketer
 Edward Bligh, 5th Earl of Darnley (1795–1835), peer and member of the House of Commons
 John Duncan Bligh (1798–1832),  diplomat
 Edward Bligh (cricketer, died 1872) (c.1800–1872), cricketer
 Edward Vesey Bligh (1829–1908), cricketer, diplomat and clergyman
 Henry Bligh (1834–1905), clergyman and cricketer
 Edward Bligh, 7th Earl of Darnley (1851–1900)
 Lodovick Bligh (1854–1884), cricketer
 Ivo Bligh, 8th Earl of Darnley (1859–1927), cricketer who captained the England cricket team in 1882/3 in Australia
 Algernon Bligh (1888–1952), English cricketer

Other
 HMS Bligh (K-467) a Buckley class destroyer escort, named after William Bligh
 Bligh Water, a shallow marine area (approximately 9500 km2 in extent) in western Fiji, named after William Bligh
 Bligh Reef, a reef in Prince William Sound, Alaska, named after William Bligh
 Bligh Island Marine Provincial Park is a provincial park in British Columbia, Canada, named after William Bligh
 Bligh Cap, former name of Rendez-Vous Islet ( Îlot du Rendez-Vous), an islet in the North-West of the Kerguelen Islands
 Electoral district of Bligh, an electoral district of the Legislative Assembly in the Australian state of New South Wales
 Bligh Park, New South Wales, a suburb of Sydney, in the state of New South Wales, Australia
 Bligh Place, Melbourne, a street in Melbourne, Victoria
 Bligh Roosters, a rugby union franchise based in Tavua
 Bligh (TV series), an Australian sitcom starring members of the cast of Fast Forward

See also 
 Bly (disambiguation)
 Blythe (disambiguation)

English-language surnames
Surnames of Irish origin